The 1946 Major League Baseball season was contested from April 16 to October 15, 1946. The St. Louis Cardinals and Boston Red Sox were the regular season champions of the National League and American League, respectively. The Cardinals defeated the Brooklyn Dodgers in a best-of-three series, for the National League title. It was Major League Baseball's first-ever regular season tie-breaker. The Cardinals then defeated the Red Sox in the World Series, four games to three.

Many notable ballplayers returned from their military service this season, following the end of World War II, such as Joe DiMaggio, Stan Musial, and Ted Williams.

This was the last MLB season to be played under the color barrier, as Jackie Robinson would make his debut with the Brooklyn Dodgers to start the following baseball season.

Awards and honors
Baseball Hall of Fame
Sam Crawford
Joe McCarthy
MLB Most Valuable Player Award
 American League: Ted Williams, Boston Red Sox, OF
 National League: Stan Musial, St. Louis Cardinals, 1B
The Sporting News Player of the Year Award
Stan Musial, St. Louis Cardinals
The Sporting News Manager of the Year Award
Eddie Dyer, St. Louis Cardinals

Standings

American League

National League

  The St. Louis Cardinals defeated the Brooklyn Dodgers in best-of-three playoff series to earn the National League pennant.

Postseason

Bracket

Managers

American League

National League

Home Field Attendance

Events
May 18 – The Chicago Cubs become the first team in Major League history to score six runs in the first and ninth innings of a game, when defeating the New York Giants 19–3.
June 9 – Mel Ott of the New York Giants is the first manager to be ejected from both games of a doubleheader, when the Giants lose both games to the Pittsburgh Pirates.

See also
1946 All-American Girls Professional Baseball League season
1946 Japanese Baseball League season

References

Further reading
Weintraub, Robert (2013) The Victory Season: The End of World War II and the Birth of Baseball's Golden Age. New York:  Little, Brown & Company. .

External links
1946 Major League Baseball season schedule at Baseball Reference

 
Major League Baseball seasons